Richard Lionel Tapper is a professor emeritus of the School of Oriental and African Studies of the University of London. He is a social anthropologist who did ethnographic field research in Iran, Afghanistan and Turkey. His publications have focussed on pastoral nomadism, relations between ethnic and tribal minorities and the state, the anthropological study of Islam, the anthropology of food, Iranian cinema, and Iranian religious politics.

Bibliography
 1979, Pasture and politics : economics, conflict, and ritual among Shahsevan nomads of northwestern Iran 
 1983 (and 2011), The Conflict of tribe and state in Iran and Afghanistan 
 1991, editor, Islam in modern Turkey : religion, politics, and literature in a secular state 
 1992, editor, Some minorities in the Middle East
 1994 (2nd edition 2001), editor, with Sami Zubaida, Culinary cultures of the Middle East = A taste of thyme: culinary cultures of the Middle East , 
 1997, Frontier nomads of Iran: a political and social history of the Shahsevan 
 2000, editor, Ayatollah Khomeini and the modernization of Islamic thought
 2002, editor, The new Iranian cinema: politics, representation and identity 
 2002, editor, with Jon Thompson, The nomadic peoples of Iran 
 2003, editor, with Keith McLachlan, Technology, tradition and survival: aspects of material culture in the Middle East and central Asia 
 2006, with Ziba Mir-Hosseini, Islam and democracy in Iran: Eshkevari and the quest for reform

External links
 

Year of birth missing (living people)
Living people
British anthropologists
Alumni of the University of Cambridge
Alumni of the University of London
Academics of SOAS University of London